Jane Katharine Hill Hon.FRES is British ecologist, and professor of ecology at the University of York and is the current President of the Royal Entomological Society; research includes the effects of climate change and habitat degradation on insects.

Education and career 
Hill did an undergraduate degree and masters at the University of Manchester and a PhD in insect ecology at Bangor University graduating in 1991.  As a postdoctoral researcher she researched the effects of climate on insects and metapopulation dynamics in butterflies at Liverpool John Moores University, the University of Leeds and Durham University.

In 2001 she moved to the University of York to be a lecturer, she became senior lecturer in 2006 and 2010 was made professor of ecology and is Deputy Head of the Department of Biology.

Hill has been Athena Swan champion in the School of Biology at York, her department was one of the first in the UK to receive the Athena Swan Gold Award in recognition of commitment to advancing the careers of women in higher education and research.

Research 
Hill carried out one of the first insect relocations, moving populations of Marbled white and Small skipper butterflies further north and east in the UK in 2000.  The project was successful and is providing information for conservation biologists to carry out future assisted insect migrations.

Her studies on insect migration, finding that butterflies and moths can fly hundred of meters in the air to take advantage of wind to speed them up, they can also make adjustments to their direction to travel more quickly to their destination.

Hill has done fieldwork in tropical ecosystems and found that oil palm plantations can act as a barrier to the movement of butterflies into and between rainforest areas, in particular the larger butterflies, shows the importance of having a network of connected habitat patches.

Her work on the effects of climate change on biodiversity has shown that moths on Mount Kinabalu in Borneo had got smaller and moved up the mountain between 1960s and 2000s, a range shift of over 60m.  British moths and butterflies respond in different ways to climate change, those species with a varied diet and higher rates of mating (such as the Green carpet and the Small dusty wave) can thrive in increasing temperatures, those such as the Pearl bordered fritilliary and the Silver-studded blue do less well as they a specialist on a few food plants and only have one generation of offspring a year.

Hill has highlighted that protected habitat areas to help maintain populations of rare species must be connected to aid migration and dispersal and should have the right climate envelopes for the species to survive future climate conditions.

Awards and honours 
Hill was awarded the Marsh Award for Conservation Biology in 2011 by the Marsh Christian Trust and the Zoological Society of London.

In 2015 she gave the Sir Julian Huxley Lecture at University College London and she gave the Stamford Raffles Lecture in 2016 at the Zoological Society of London.

She was made Honorary Fellow of the Royal Entomological Society in 2016 and is a Trustee of the British Ecological Society.

From September 2022 she is President of the Royal Entomological Society.

References

External links 

 University of York: Profile

Living people
Year of birth missing (living people)
British ecologists
British entomologists
Fellows of the Royal Entomological Society
Women entomologists
Alumni of the University of Manchester
Women ecologists
Alumni of Bangor University
Academics of the University of York
20th-century British scientists
20th-century British women scientists
21st-century British scientists
21st-century British women scientists